The Ian Fowler Executive of the Year Award is an annual National Basketball League of Canada (NBL) award given since the 2011–12 season. It is awarded to the top member of the NBL Canada's executive committee, including the owners of the teams. The recipient is chosen by the league commissioner. It is one of two business awards given by the NBL, the other being New Franchise of the Year. London is the only team in the league that has had more than one of its front office members win the award. Kimo Blanco of the Moncton Miracles was the first woman to be honored; in 2019–20 Melissa Melnychuk became the second. 

The award is named after the late Ian R. Fowler, a Moncton city employee that played a major role in developing sport teams in the city, including the Miracles.

References 

National Basketball League of Canada awards